Carex leptopoda, also known as slender-footed sedge and short-scale sedge, is a tussock-forming perennial in the family Cyperaceae. It is to Western Canada, United States, and Mexico.

See also
 List of Carex species

References

leptopoda
Plants described in 1917
Flora of North America
Taxa named by Kenneth Kent Mackenzie